Paphiopedilum subgenus Sigmatopetalum is a subgenus of the genus Paphiopedilum.

Distribution
Plants from this section are found from India and China, down to Southeast Asia, Papua New Guinea and the Solomon Islands .

Species
Paphiopedilum subgenus Sigmatopetalum comprises the following species:

References

Orchid subgenera